The 1923 season was the fourth year of competitive football for the Estonia as an independent nation.

Matches

Lithuania vs Estonia
The first ever win for Estonia in an international match. Hat-trick scorer Vladimir Tell was the first one to ever score more than one goal in a match for the blueshirts. He also became the all-time appearance leader, having played in all six matches. Lithuania's first international match.

Estonia vs Latvia
For the second match in a row, goalkeeper August Lass fulfilled the captain duties.

Estonia vs Russian SFSR
Elmar Kaljot was the first player to score a goal in his debut match. Austrian referee, Max Adler, was the manager of JK Tallinna Kalev.

Estonia vs Poland

Estonia vs Finland
Estonia's first win in front of the home crowd.

Players
These 17 players appeared for the national team in 1923:

 Harald Kaarman (5)
 August Lass (5)
 Heinrich Paal (5)
 Arnold Pihlak (5)
 Johannes Brenner (4)

 Ernst Joll (4)
 Bernhard Rein (4)
 Vladimir Tell (4)
 Elmar Kaljot (3)
 Eduard Maurer (3)

 Otto Silber (3)
 Georg Vain (3)
 Oskar Üpraus (3)
 August Silber (2)
 Hugo Väli (2)

 Eugen Eiman (1)
 Eduard Ellman-Eelma (1)

Goalscorers
 Vladimir Tell (4)
 Ernst Joll (2)
 Elmar Kaljot (2)
 Heinrich Paal (2)
 Eduard Ellman-Eelma (1)

Debutants
 #25: Johannes Brenner in the match against Lithuania.
 #26–#27: Elmar Kaljot and Hugo Väli in the match against Soviet Russia.
 #28: Eugen Eiman in the match against Poland.

References

1923
1923 national football team results
National